Dnieper Metallurgical Combine is one of the biggest metallurgical companies in Ukraine along with Kryvorizhstal and Illich Steel and Iron Works. It is located in Kamianske, Dnipropetrovsk Oblast.

Overview

The main plant was founded back in 1887 by the South-Russian Dnieper Association as the Dnieper Works.

With the occupation of Ukraine by Bolsheviks in 1917, the plant was "nationalized". Due to the war like situation in the region, the main plant did not operate consistently until 1925 when it was officially taken off the conservation and resumed its operations. The same year the plant received the name of Feliks Dzerzhynsky who at that time was a chairman of the Supreme Soviet of the National Economy.

About ten years later the city of Kamianske where the plant is located also followed the example and in 1936 it was renamed into Dniprodzerzhynsk.

See also
List of steel producers
Economy of Ukraine
Metallurgy of Ukraine

References

External links 
 Company website

Kamianske
Steel companies of Ukraine
Steel companies of the Ukrainian Soviet Socialist Republic
Industrial Union of Donbas